Treales, Roseacre and Wharles is a civil parish in the Borough of Fylde, Lancashire, England. It had a population of 492 at the 2011 Census. It lies two miles east of Kirkham and includes the villages of Bolton Houses, Moor Side, Roseacre, Treales and Wharles.

Treales
The name of the village is given as "Treueles" in the Domesday Book and as "Turuel" in 1242. In 1066 Treales was a member the fee of Earl Tostig and was assessed as two plough-lands. It was later a member of the Weeton fee and was held successively by Boteler and Stanley, and the lordship then descended to the Earl of Derby. In 1228–29 a mandate was issued to the sheriff in respect of a Lewe de Treales, who had found ancient coins while ploughing. In 1637 Sir Edward Osbaldeston had a small rent from Treales. In 1717 some "Papists" of Treales and Roseacre registered estates.

In Treales the Anglican parish church, Christ Church, is situated on Church Road. It was built 1855 by Lord Stanley, when the Patron was the vicar of Kirkham. The church is now part of a benefice with Christ Church, Wesham.

The Derby Arms public house is situated on the corner of Kirkham Road and Church Road. The village has a windmill, now converted to a private dwelling.

Wharles
The name of the village is given as "Quarlous" in 1249; and as "Warlawes" and "Werlows" in 1286. Historically Rosacre and Wharles were probably improvements from the waste of the settlement at Treales. It does not appear that they were ever considered to be manors. In 1631 Thomas Firth (Styth) of Wharles was fined £10, having refused a knighthood. 

Wharles is the venue for the annual Fylde Vintage and Farm Show, which takes place in a field next to the M55 motorway.

Roseacre
The name of the village is given as "Rasaker" and "Raysakur" in 1249. The Presbyterians had a licensed meeting-place in Roseacre in 1689, but this does not seem to have been permanent. 

In February 2019, the government refused planning permission for fracking at Roseacre Wood. The application, by energy firm Cuadrilla, had been refused by the local council and was the subject of a public inquiry. The secretary of state said highway safety issues had not been "satisfactorily addressed" and refused planning permission.

See also
Listed buildings in Treales, Roseacre and Wharles

References

External links

 "Treales, Roseacre & Wharles" at prestonuk.co.uk
 Treales, Roseacre and Wharles at genuki

Civil parishes in Lancashire
Geography of the Borough of Fylde